Yuriy Druchyk (born 2 February 1987) is a Ukrainian former professional football defender who plays in the amateur Volyn Oblast league.

Career
Druchyk began his playing career with FC Volyn Lutsk's double team. Than he played on loan in FC Nyva Ternopil and in FC Belshina Bobruisk in Belarusian Premier League.

References

External links 
 Profile on Belshina club site (Rus)
 
 
 

1987 births
Living people
Ukrainian footballers
Association football defenders
Ukrainian expatriate footballers
Expatriate footballers in Belarus
FC Volyn Lutsk players
FC Nyva Ternopil players
FC Belshina Bobruisk players
FC Dynamo Brest players
FC Kovel-Volyn Kovel players